The Doorpost Film Project is one of the largest annual, online film festivals in the world, established by Jason Atkins with Project Director Nathan Elliott, Project Coordinator Brian Jerin, Supervising Producer Jonathan Shepard, Web developer Dana Luther, Editor Gabe Cox and Designer Will Hill. It has 3 stages that take place from October through November of the following year.

Winners
The 2008 Winner was John Gray with his film "Before I Wake".
The 2009 Festival Champion was Butterfly Circus directed by Joshua Weigel.

Prizes
The 2010 Short Film Contest sponsored by the Doorpost Film Project is awarding over $160,000 in prizes.

Mission
The Doorpost Film Project aimed to inspire and reward aspiring and beginning filmmakers to make quality films.

Dissolution
The Doorpost Film Project is dissolved.
In accordance with Tennessee Code Title 48 for Nonprofit Corporations  Chapter 64  Part 1  § 48-64-104
The Doorpost Foundation has been dissolved as of 11:59pm June 30, 2013.
http://www.thedoorpost.com/

References

Internet film festivals